North Cleaver Lake is a lake in the Unorganized Part of Thunder Bay District in Northwestern Ontario, Canada.

The lake has no inflows. The primary outflow is an unnamed creek at the west which leads west to the  distant Winston Lake. Winston Lake drains via Winston Creek and the Pays Plat River to Lake Superior.

References

Lakes of Thunder Bay District